Compsocus is a genus within the Psocoptera order of insects, commonly known as booklice or barklice. The only known species in this genus, Compsocus elegans, is found in Mexico and Central America. It was first identified by Nathan Banks in 1930.

References

External links
genus Compsocus Banks, 1930. Psocodea Species File Online
species Compsocus elegans Banks, 1930. Psocodea Species File Online

Troctomorpha
Psocoptera genera
Monotypic insect genera
Insects of Central America
Taxa named by Nathan Banks